Chabertia is a genus of plants in the family Rosaceae.

Species 
 Chabertia acanthocarpa
 Chabertia adriatica
 Chabertia agrestis
 Chabertia benearnensis
 Chabertia cladophora
 Chabertia croatica
 Chabertia dalmatica
 Chabertia dicranodendron
 Chabertia discedens
 Chabertia elegans
 Chabertia elongatula
 Chabertia freynii
 Chabertia grandicorona
 Chabertia haussmanniana
 Chabertia hispidula
 Chabertia hungarica
 Chabertia impolita
 Chabertia istriaca
 Chabertia lageniformis
 Chabertia lemanii
 Chabertia leptoclada
 Chabertia occidentalis
 Chabertia panicicii
 Chabertia pannonica
 Chabertia rotundifolia
 Chabertia rubiginosa
 Chabertia sarcostephana
 Chabertia scleroacantha
 Chabertia serbica
 Chabertia tommasiniana
 Chabertia trenescenensis
 Chabertia vasconica
 Chabertia virgultorum

 Names brought to synonymy
 Chabertia micrantha, a synonym of Rosa micrantha
 Chabertia sepium, a synonym of Rosa agrestis
 Chabertia umbellata, a synonym of Rosa rubiginosa

References

External links 

Rosaceae genera